Carrick is a locality in the Goulburn Mulwaree Council, New South Wales, Australia. It is located on the northern side of the Hume Highway to the east of Goulburn. Carrick railway station was a station on the Main Southern railway line from 1869 to 1975. It had a public school from 1873 to 1909, operating as a "half-time" school from 1887.

References

Localities in New South Wales
Southern Tablelands
Goulburn Mulwaree Council